The Europe/Africa Zone was one of the three zones of the regional Davis Cup competition in 1998.

In the Europe/Africa Zone there were four different tiers, called groups, in which teams competed against each other to advance to the upper tier. The top two teams in Group IV advanced to the Europe/Africa Zone Group III in 1999. All other teams remained in Group IV.

Participating nations

Draw
 Venue: Lugogo Tennis Club, Kampala, Uganda
 Date: 28 January–1 February

Group A

Group B

1st to 4th place play-offs

5th to 8th place play-offs

Final standings

  and  promoted to Group III in 1999.

Round robin

Group A

Uganda vs. Armenia

Benin vs. Djibouti

Uganda vs. Benin

Armenia vs. Djibouti

Uganda vs. Djibouti

Armenia vs. Benin

Group B

Azerbaijan vs. Botswana

Cameroon vs. Sudan

Azerbaijan vs. Cameroon

Botswana vs. Sudan

Azerbaijan vs. Sudan

Botswana vs. Cameroon

1st to 4th place play-offs

Semifinals

Armenia vs. Botswana

Cameroon vs. Benin

Final

Armenia vs. Benin

3rd to 4th play-off

Botswana vs. Cameroon

5th to 8th place play-offs

5th to 8th play-offs

Uganda vs. Sudan

Azerbaijan vs. Djibouti

5th to 6th play-off

Azerbaijan vs. Uganda

7th to 8th play-off

Djibouti vs. Sudan

References

External links
Davis Cup official website

Davis Cup Europe/Africa Zone
Europe Africa Zone Group IV